The Vlach Folklore Museum is located in the three-story building in the center of Serres, in Greece's Macedonia region. The museum houses an educational wing on the ground floor,  a recreation of a typical Aromanian house on the first floor and exhibition space on the second floor. The museum also showcases the lifestyle of Aromanian culture from childbirth through careers and wedding traditions. This includes children's toys and a sarmanitsa (a kind of swing in which the baby falls asleep). A family is shown gathered at dinner time as well as one of the most important moments in the life of an Aromanian (Aromanians are known as "Vlachs" in Greece), the wedding together with the presentation of the dowry.

References

External links

Folk museums in Central Macedonia
Museums in Serres
Aromanians in Greece